Mofokeng is a surname. It may refer to:

Gabriel Mofokeng (born 1982), South African footballer
George Mofokeng (born 1979), South African long-distance runner
George Mofokeng (born 1979), South African footballer
Jerry Mofokeng (born 1956), South African actor
Lethola Mofokeng (born 1984), South African footballer
Mandla Mofokeng (born 1967), South African musician
Ryder Mofokeng (born 1950), South African footballer and football manager
Sammy Mofokeng (born 1991), South African cricketer
Santu Mofokeng (1956–2020), South African photographer
Tlaleng Mofokeng, South African physician
 

Bantu-language surnames